HMAS Junee (J362/M362), named for the town of Junee, New South Wales, was one of 60 Bathurst-class corvettes constructed during World War II, and one of 36 initially manned and commissioned solely by the Royal Australian Navy (RAN).

Design and construction

In 1938, the Australian Commonwealth Naval Board (ACNB) identified the need for a general purpose 'local defence vessel' capable of both anti-submarine and mine-warfare duties, while easy to construct and operate. Construction of the prototype  did not go ahead, but the plans were retained. The need for locally built 'all-rounder' vessels at the start of World War II saw the "Australian Minesweepers" (designated as such to hide their anti-submarine capability, but popularly referred to as "corvettes") approved in September 1939, with 60 constructed during the course of the war: 36 (including Junee) ordered by the RAN, 20 ordered by the British Admiralty but manned and commissioned as RAN vessels, and 4 for the Royal Indian Navy.

Junee was laid down by Poole & Steel at Balmain, New South Wales on 17 February 1943. She was launched on 16 November 1943 by the wife of John Solomon Rosevear, Speaker of the Australian House of Representatives, and commissioned into the RAN on 11 April 1944.

Operational history

World War II
After entering active service, Junee was briefly assigned to New Guinea before being redeployed to Darwin, where she served as an anti-submarine patrol ship until February 1945, when the corvette underwent refit in Melbourne.

In April 1945, Junee was sent to New Guinea, to serve as a convoy escort and anti-submarine patrol ship. In August, the corvette fired her weapons in anger for the first time; sinking three Japanese supply barges while in the Sangir Islands. The corvette was later assigned to Balikpapan as a guard ship, where she remained until the end of World War II.

Following the end of the war, Junee evacuated Australian prisoners-of-war and civilians, assisted in the transportation of occupation forces, and aided in the reestablishment of Dutch authority in the Netherlands East Indies. After fulfilling these duties, Junee returned to Australia, and was paid off into reserve in Melbourne on 21 January 1946.

Junee received two battle honours for her wartime service: "New Guinea 1943" and "Pacific 1944–45".

Post-war
The corvette was reactivated and recommissioned as a training ship on 25 February 1953. Initially operating along the east coast, Junee was reassigned to the west coast on 25 August, operating from Fremantle.

Decommissioning and fate
HMAS Junee paid off to reserve for the final time at Fremantle on 21 August 1957. She was sold for scrap to W. G. Davies of Fremantle on 18 June 1958. The ship was stripped and the hull sunk in the Rottnest ship graveyard off Rottnest Island, Western Australia on 6 or 7 September 1968.

Citations

References
Books

Journal and news articles

External links

Bathurst-class corvettes of the Royal Australian Navy
Ships built in New South Wales
1943 ships
World War II corvettes of Australia
Training ships of the Royal Australian Navy
Scuttled vessels of Australia